Certified Project Management Professional (CPMP) is a certification created by the National Project Management Association (NPMA) in Taiwan, R.O.C.

See also 

 Prince2
 Certified Associate in Project Management

References

External links 

 www.NPMA.org.tw

Project management certification
Economy of Taiwan